Wilfredo "Willy" Sardido Caminero (born October 12, 1954) is a Filipino politician who served as the representative for the 2nd district of Cebu from 2013 to 2022. He served as mayor of Argao, Cebu from 1998 to 2007 and as member of the Cebu Provincial Board representing the 2nd district from 2007 to 2013.

Political career

Mayor of Argao (1998–2007)
Caminero started his political career after winning as a municipal councilor of Argao in the 1988 elections. He went on to become the town's vice mayor from 1992 to 1998 and later won as mayor in the 1998 elections.

Cebu Provincial Board (2007–2013)
Caminero ran for board member of Cebu's 2nd district in the 2007 elections and went on to be re-elected for two consecutive terms serving until 2013.

House of Representatives (2013–present)
Caminero ran for representative of Cebu's 2nd district in the 2013 elections. He defeated incumbent Pablo P. Garcia, who previously served as Governor of Cebu. He also won against Teresita Celis in 2016 and Ronald Allan Cesante in 2019.

He is currently serving as the Chairperson of the Special Committee on Food Security and the Vice Chairperson of the Committee on Agriculture and Food.

Electoral history

House of Representatives

References

External links
 
 Congressional Profile

1954 births
People from Cebu
Members of the House of Representatives of the Philippines from Cebu
National Unity Party (Philippines) politicians
Living people
Cebuano people
Members of the Cebu Provincial Board
20th-century Filipino politicians
21st-century Filipino politicians